Ọmọ n'Ọba n'Ẹdo Uku Akpọlọkpọlọ, Akenzua II (7 January 1899 – 11 June 1978) was the Oba of Benin (traditional leader of the Edo people, in Nigeria) from 1933 until his death in 1978.

Akenzua II was enthroned as Oba of Benin in April 1933 following the death of his father, Eweka II (r.1914 – 1933) in February that year. Oba Akenzua II was dedicated to the provision of western education for his subjects, the Edo people.

In 1936, he began the movement to return to Nigeria the Benin Bronzes looted from the royal compounds and ancestral altars in the punitive Benin Expedition of 1897. During his reign, only two of the 3,000 royal court bronzes were returned. However, two coral crowns and coral bead garment, thought to have belonged to Ovonramwen, were returned to him in the late 1930s by G.M. Miller a son of a member of the Benin expedition, who had loaned the pieces to the British Museum in 1935.

Oba Akenzua II died on 11 June 1978, when he was succeeded by his son, then Prince Solomon, who took on the title of Oba Erediauwa and duties as the traditional leader of the Edo people in Benin City, Nigeria.

Family

In 1923 his first son, Prince Solomon Aiseokhuoba Igbinoghodua Akenzua, was born. His chosen title was founded on the name Ere, relating to Oba Eresonye who is traditionally considered to be an incredibly wealthy Oba.

Akenzua's descendants include his daughter Princess Elizabeth Olowu, granddaughter Peju Layiwola, and grandson Thompson Iyamu.

See also
 Akenzua family
 Princess Elizabeth Olowu
 Peju Layiwola
 Oba of Benin
 Ovia Idah

References

External links
https://books.google.com/books/about/Oba_Akenzua_II_C_M_G.html?id=Sr0MAQAAIAAJ&redir_esc=y
http://www.artic.edu/aic/collections/exhibitions/benin/artwork/190979

1978 deaths
1899 births
Nigerian royalty
Place of birth missing
Place of death missing
Edo people
19th-century Nigerian people
20th-century Nigerian people
Akenzua family
Obas of Benin